Oleksandr Oleksandrovych Pyshchur (born 24 January 2005) is a Ukrainian professional footballer who plays as a forward for Hungarian club Puskás Akadémia II.

Career
Oleksandr Pyshchur, born in Chernihiv, where he started his career with Desna-3 Chernihiv, then in summer 2020 he moved to Munkach Mukachevo where he played in the Ukrainian Second League. On 1 October 2021 he scored against Rubikon Kyiv giving the victory for his team. On 30 October 2021 he played against his hometown club Chernihiv at the Chernihiv Arena. In January 2022 he moved to the Hungarian club Puskás Akadémia II playing in Nemzeti Bajnokság III for the season 2021–22 season.

Personal life
His father Oleksandr Pyshchur was also a professional football player.

Career statistics

Club

References

External links
 
 
 

2005 births
Living people
Footballers from Chernihiv
Ukrainian footballers
Association football forwards
FC Desna-3 Chernihiv players
MFA Mukachevo players
Puskás Akadémia FC II players
Ukrainian Second League players
Nemzeti Bajnokság III players
Ukrainian expatriate footballers
Expatriate footballers in Hungary
Ukrainian expatriate sportspeople in Hungary